Orlando Contreras Collantes (born 11 June 1982 in Pucallpa, Lima) is a Peruvian footballer who plays as a center back for Academia Deportiva Cantolao in the Peruvian First Division.

Club career
Contreras started his career in the youth academy of Universitario de Deportes, playing for their second team América Cochahuayco.

He was already a skilled defender but at that time Universitario de Deportes had great defenders so he never got the opportunity to play for their senior squad.

In 2004, he left América Cochahuayco and to join Unión Huaral.

After his experience at Unión Huaral he went to FBC Melgar. There he was partnered with Pedro Aparicio and Carlos Solis.

In 2007 Contreras joined newly formed Peruvian club Universidad San Martín. There he had the best of seasons in all his career. It was rumoured that he would join several big Peruvian clubs such as Alianza Lima or Sporting Cristal, or possibly a European club. In 2008, he was named Player of the year and Defender of the year by Direct TV.

At the beginning of 2009 Alianza Lima confirmed that they had reached an agreement with Orlando to join them until the end of the season.

International career

Honours

Club
Universidad San Martín
 Torneo Apertura: 2007
 Torneo Clausura: 2008
 Torneo Descentralizado: 2007, 2008, 2010

Individual
Torneo Descentralizado Defender of the Year: 2008
Torneo Descentralizado Player of the Year: 2008

Personal life
Orlando Contreras' parents are Elena and Orlando Contreras.

References

External links
 
 
 
 

1982 births
Living people
People from Pucallpa
Association football central defenders
Association football sweepers
Peruvian footballers
Peru international footballers
U América F.C. footballers
Unión Huaral footballers
FBC Melgar footballers
Club Deportivo Universidad de San Martín de Porres players
Club Alianza Lima footballers
Juan Aurich footballers
Club Deportivo Universidad César Vallejo footballers
León de Huánuco footballers
Deportivo Municipal footballers